The Orphanage of Iran, subtitled "A Historical Account of a Genuine Holocaust in Iran", is a 2016 Iranian action drama film directed by Abolqasem Talebi and set during the Invasion of Iran in World War I and Persian famine of 1917–1919.

Cast
 Alirum Nouraei as Muhammad-Javad Bonakdar
 Farrokh Nemati as the Doctor
 Bahar Mohammadpour as Muhammad-Javad's wife
 Ali Shademan as Hesam
 Jafar Dehghan as Abdossattar, a Jewish merchant collaborating with the British
 Melika Sha'aban as A'zam
 British personnel
 Paul Dewdney as Major General Lionel Dunsterville
 John O'Toole as Sir Lionel Rothschild
 Tommie Grabiec as Colonel Goldsmith
 Cameron Chapman as Major Smith
 Bryan Torfeh as Lieutenant John Straw
 Toby Hughes as Sir Percy Cox

Screening
In February 2016, the film was screened in the 34th edition of Fajr International Film Festival as one of the few participated in non-competition section. It was released in October 2016. The film was displayed in Buenos Aires in February 2017, in an event co-organized by the Ammar Popular Film Festival and the National Institute of Cinema and Audiovisual Arts.

Miguel Littín the director from Latin America also attended the international Ammar film festival and expressed his opinion about the film: 
 Although it seems difficult to represent the history, the characters and atmosphere are created in a perfect way and I saw the tone, narration and what we are supposed to see in the history. I got pleasure from the film indeed.

Reception 
According to Mehr News Agency, the film is "considered as anti-British work". It had a poor opening, grossing only $10,000 in the first week.

Awards and nominations

References

External links
 

2016 films
Films set in Iran
Iranian historical films
2016 action drama films
Iranian drama films